By-elections to the 2nd State Duma of the Russian Federation were held to fill vacant seats in the State Duma between the 1995 election and the 1999 election.

External links
Состав Государственной Думы второго созыва (1996-1999)
Депутаты Государственной Думы II созыва

1996 elections in Russia
1997 elections in Russia
1998 elections in Russia
 2
2nd State Duma of the Russian Federation